The High Court of Australia is composed of seven Justices: the Chief Justice of Australia and six other Justices. There have been 56 Justices who have served as Justices of the High Court since its formation under the Judiciary Act 1903. Under Section 71 of the Australian Constitution, the judicial power of the Commonwealth of Australia is vested in the court, and it has been the highest court in the Australian court hierarchy since the passing of the Australia Act 1986.

In a May 2017 speech, Justice Virginia Bell observed that "few Australians outside the law schools are likely to be able to name the Chief Justice, let alone the puisne Justices of the High Court".

History
Initially, there were three Justices of the High Court – Chief Justice Sir Samuel Griffith, Justice Sir Edmund Barton and Justice Richard Edward O'Connor. The number was expanded in 1906, at the request of the Justices, to five, with the appointment of Justices Sir Isaac Isaacs and H. B. Higgins. After O'Connor's death in 1912, an amendment to the Judiciary Act 1903 expanded the bench to seven. For most of 1930, two seats were left vacant due to monetary constraints placed on the court by the Depression. The economic downturn had also led to a reduction in litigation and consequently less work for the court. After Isaacs retired in 1931, his seat was left empty, and in 1933 an amendment to the Judiciary Act officially reduced the number of seats to six. However, this led to some decisions being split three-all. With the appointment of William Webb in 1946, the number of seats returned to seven, and since then the court has had seven Justices.  there have been 55 Justices, thirteen of whom have been Chief Justice.

Appointments to the court were for life until 1977, when a mandatory retirement age of 70 was established, though several post-1977 Justices have retired before reaching the age of 70 (William Deane resigned as a Justice to be appointed Governor-General).

Composition of the High Court
There have been 56 Justices of the High Court; forty-nine have been men and seven women. The first female Justice was Mary Gaudron who was a Justice from 1987 to 2003. Susan Crennan was a Justice from 2005 to 2015, and Virginia Bell from 2009 to 2021. The current Chief Justice of Australia Susan Kiefel is the first woman to have been appointed to the position. She was appointed in 2017 and had been a Justice from 2007 to 2017. Of the seven current Justices, four are women, including the Chief Justice. Michelle Gordon was appointed in 2015 and Jacqueline Gleeson in 2021, replacing Bell. Jayne Jagot replaced Justice Keane on the court in 2022, giving women a majority on the High Court for the first time.

13 politicians, serving or former, have been appointed to the High Court of Australia. Nine Justices have served in the Parliament of Australia: Edmund Barton, Richard O'Connor, Isaac Isaacs, H. B. Higgins, Edward McTiernan, H. V. Evatt, John Latham, Garfield Barwick, and Lionel Murphy. All but Evatt were appointed after their parliamentary service; Evatt resigned from the bench in order to pursue his federal political career, although he had previously served in the New South Wales Legislative Assembly. In addition to the above, four Justices served in colonial parliaments: Samuel Griffith, Charles Powers, Albert Piddington and Adrian Knox, although all concluded their political careers more than 10 years prior to their appointments. As of 2020, the most recent Justice to serve in state or federal parliament is Lionel Murphy.

List of Justices
The current judges are listed in bold on the table below.

Current Justices

Seats of the High Court
This following chart illustrates the composition of the High Court. It indicates the seven seats of the court, and who has occupied each seat at different points in the court's existence. The red portions represent the future part of a judge's term and show the date at which they are bound to retire from the court (although they may choose to retire before that date). The blue portions of a judge's term show a period in which that judge was Chief Justice.

See also
 High Court of Australia
 List of law schools attended by Australian High Court Justices
 List of Chief Justices of Australia by time in office
 List of jurists

References

External links

 High Court of Australia – official website

 
Lists of judges of Australian superior courts
Lists of office-holders in Australia
Lists of Australian judges
Australia